IUG may stand for:

the International University in Geneva, a private University in Switzerland
the Islamic University of Gaza
an institute of the University of Bamako
an institute of the University of Grenoble-Alpes in France